Moy Herborg Regina Nordahl  (14 November 1907 – 17 June 1993) was a Norwegian physiotherapist and politician.

She was born in Buksnes to Otto Rinnan and Helena Hansen. She was elected deputy representative to the Storting for several periods, 1945–1965, for the Conservative Party. She replaced Håkon Kyllingmark at the Storting August–September 1963, when Kyllingmark was member of Lyng's Cabinet. Nordahl served as vice president of the Norwegian Red Cross from 1966 to 1972.

References

1907 births
1993 deaths
People from Vestvågøy
Conservative Party (Norway) politicians
Members of the Storting
Women members of the Storting